Arnold Wetl (born 2 February 1970 in Eibiswald) is a retired Austrian footballer who played as a midfielder.

Club career
During his career he played for Sturm Graz, with whom he won 4 domestic cup titles, FC Porto, Rapid Wien and FC Gratkorn.

International career
Wetl made his debut for Austria in an April 1991 friendly match against Norway and was a participant at the 1998 FIFA World Cup. He earned 21 caps, scoring 4 goals. His final international match was the embarrassing 0–9 defeat by Spain in a European Championship qualification match in March 1999.

Honours
Austrian Cup (1):
 1996
Portuguese Liga : (1)
 1996–97
Portuguese Supercup (1):
 1996

External links
 Rapid stats - Rapid Archive

References

1970 births
Living people
People from Deutschlandsberg District
Austrian footballers
Austria international footballers
1998 FIFA World Cup players
SK Sturm Graz players
FC Porto players
SK Rapid Wien players
Austrian Football Bundesliga players
Primeira Liga players
Austrian expatriate footballers
Expatriate footballers in Portugal
FC Gratkorn players
Association football midfielders
Austrian expatriate sportspeople in Portugal
Footballers from Styria